Pamuru is a town in Prakasam district of the Indian state of Andhra Pradesh. It is the mandal headquarters of Pamuru mandal in Kanigiri revenue division. This is the border town of Prakasam district. This is near from Nellore than Ongole around 100 km and also near by Kadapa. It is 66km away from Podili, 38km away from Kanigiri, 60km away from Kandukur.

Demographics 

The total 
population constitute,  males,  females and 
 children, in the age The average literacy rate stands at 
75.31% with  literates, higher than the national average of 73.00%.

Education
The primary and secondary school education is imparted by government, aided and private schools, under the School Education Department of the state. The medium of instruction followed by different schools are English, Telugu. Chief minister Nara Chandrababu Naidu laid foundation stone for the Dr APJ Abdul Kalam IIIT at Dubagunta in Pamuru mandal of Kanigiri assembly constituency. IIIT will be constructed and infrastructure provided with a budget of Rs 1200 crores.

References 

Census towns in Andhra Pradesh